Wayne F. Whittow (August 16, 1933) is an American politician, former Wisconsin legislator and retired City Treasurer of the City of Milwaukee. He is a Democrat.

Background 
Whittow was born in Milwaukee. He graduated from Washington High School in 1951, attended the University of Wisconsin–Milwaukee, and served in the U.S. Army from 1955 to 1957. He then went to work at the AC Spark Plug factory in their engineering administration department.

Public office 
In 1960, in his first race for public office at the age of 26 (his brother George was a city alderman), he received the Democratic nomination for the 16th district of the Wisconsin State Assembly by a 3-vote margin (1472–1469). He was then elected to the first of three consecutive terms in the House. In 1967, he moved up to the Wisconsin State Senate, representing the 11th Senate District. He was twice re-elected, and eventually served as Senate Majority Leader until being elected Milwaukee City Treasurer in 1976. (He had previously run, unsuccessfully, for City Comptroller in 1968 and for City Treasurer in 1972).

Personal life 
Whittow holds both bachelor's and master's degrees in business administration from University of Wisconsin–Milwaukee. He is a lifelong resident of Milwaukee. He and his wife Paula have three sons and (as of January 2010) six grandchildren.

References

External links 
Office of the City Treasurer

Living people
Democratic Party members of the Wisconsin State Assembly
Politicians from Milwaukee
Democratic Party Wisconsin state senators
1933 births
University of Wisconsin–Milwaukee alumni